Robanov Kot is a dispersed settlement in the Municipality of Solčava in northern Slovenia. The area belongs to the traditional region of Styria and is now included in the Savinja Statistical Region.

Geography
Robanov Kot lies along the main road from Luče to Solčava, which follows the Savinja River. Hamlets and farmsteads in the settlement include Gašpirc, Haudej, Opresnik, Račnik, Roban, Rogovilc, Suhadolnik, and Tolstovršnik. The territory of the settlement extends southwest along the Roban Cirque, reaching its highest elevation at Mount Ojstrica, and northeast along the slope of Big Mount Raduha.

References

External links
Robanov Kot on Geopedia

Populated places in the Municipality of Solčava